Stegea powelli is a moth in the family Crambidae. It is found in North America, where it has been recorded from California.

References

Moths described in 1972
Glaphyriinae